Nikolay Alekseevich Kurganskiy (born 19 March 1961 in Ekibastuz) is a former Kazakh professional football player. He played for FC Ekibastuzets in the Soviet Second League and Kazakhstan Premier League, appearing in over 400 league matches, scoring more than 150 goals.

Kurganskiy made seven appearances for the Kazakhstan national football team, scoring twice.

Awards
 1993 Kazakhstan FF "Best Player of the year"
 Kazakhstan Second Top scorer: 1992, 1993

Career statistics

International goals
Scores and results list. Kazakhstan's goal tally first.

References

External links
 

1965 births
Living people
Soviet footballers
Kazakhstani footballers
Kazakhstan international footballers
Kazakhstan Premier League players
Kazakhstani expatriate footballers
Expatriate footballers in Finland
Association football forwards
People from Pavlodar Region